Lilienfeld radiation, named after Julius Edgar Lilienfeld, is electromagnetic radiation produced when electrons hit a metal surface.

The Smith–Purcell effect is believed to be a variant of Lilienfeld radiation. 

Lilienfeld radiation is shown as Transition radiation by Vitaly Ginzburg and Ilya Frank in 1945

References

Particle physics
Electromagnetic radiation